Aurore Tillac (born in 1980) is a French choir conductor. Since 2007, she has been directing the Choir of the French Army and the Republican Guard.

Biography 
Born in Miélan in the Gers department Aurore Tillac was very early passionate with vocal and instrumental music, and particularly traditional music. At age 15, she won the first prize in diatonic button accordion at the festival of Castelnau-Barbarens. At the end of a first training in instrumental and vocal music that she finished at the National School of Music in Tarbes, with a Golden medal and a First prize in clarinet, chamber music and musical training, she entered the class of choir conducting of the conservatoire de Paris where she obtained a first prize in the Gregorian chant specialty.

At the same time she conducts the "Concentus vocal" in a wide repertoire ranging from Gregorian chant to contemporary music and directs the Choir of the Universities of Paris. Since 2007, she has been creating and directing the "Manufacture vocale", a variable geometry ensemble with an eclectic repertoire.

In 2005 she joined the Chœur de l'Armée française à la Garde as assistant conductor and then choir conductor since 2007. She holds the rank of lieutenant colonel.

References

External links 
 Aurore Tillac on concerts.fr
 Aurore Tillac on France Musique
 Aurore Tillac, chef de choeur de l'armée française on France Bleu
 Biographie de la lieutenante-colonelle Aurore Tillac on gendarmerie.interieur.gouv.fr
 Aurore Tillac on LCI
 Aurore Tillac fait chanter l'armée française in Le Figaro (5 July 2010)

French choral conductors
Conservatoire de Paris alumni
1980 births
People from Gers
Living people
21st-century French conductors (music)